Barrett v IBC International Ltd [1995] 3 NZLR 160 is a cited case in New Zealand	 regarding the legal concept of certainty regarding contract formation.

Background
For the sum of $2, Barrett gave IBC International an option to purchase their property within the following 180 days. However, the settlement date in the contract merely stated it "to be mutually agreed upon exercise of option".

When IBC subsequently tried to purchase the property under this option, Barrett said the option was unenforceable, given the date of settlement was not agreed to in the option contract.

Held
The court held that as the date of settlement was uncertain, the option contract was not legally binding.

References

Court of Appeal of New Zealand cases
New Zealand contract case law
1995 in New Zealand law
1995 in case law